Shekhar Kulbhushan Kapur (born 6 December 1945) is an Indian filmmaker and actor. Kapur was born into the Anand-Sahni family, Kapur is the recipient of several accolades, including a BAFTA Award, a National Film Award, a National Board of Review Award and three Filmfare Awards, in addition to nomination for a Golden Globe Award. 

Kapur became known in Bollywood with his recurring role in the television series Khandaan. He then made his directorial debut with cult classic Masoom in 1983, before gaining widespread acclaim with Mr. India in 1987. He then gained international recognition and acclaim in 1994 with biographical film Bandit Queen, based on the infamous Indian bandit and politician Phoolan Devi, it was premiered in the directors fortnight section of the 1994 Cannes Film Festival and was screened at the Edinburgh Film Festival. 

Kapur achieved further international prominence with the 1998 period film Elizabeth, a fictional account of the reign of British Queen Elizabeth I, which was nominated for seven Academy Awards. He then directed war drama film The Four Feathers (2002). In 2007, he directed Elizabeth: The Golden Age, the sequel to his 1998 Elizabeth film.

Early life and education 
Shekhar was born on 6 December 1945 in Lahore, Punjab, British India, in a Punjabi Hindu family to Kulbhushan Kapoor, a doctor with a flourishing practice, and his wife Sheel Kanta Kapoor.

While on a train from the newly created Pakistan to India, a massacre took place; Kapur's mother Sheel played dead and hid both himself and his sister under her body. Reflecting on this, Kapur stated that the partition of India happened through "the blood of one people".

The nephew of famous Indian actor Dev Anand, he was discouraged from getting into films by his father. Sheel Kanta was the sister of actors Chetan, Dev and Vijay Anand. Kapur is the only son of his parents and he has three sisters. One of his sisters, Neelu, was the first wife of actor Navin Nischol, while another sister, Aruna, is the wife of actor Parikshit Sahni. His third and youngest sister is Sohaila Kapur.

Kapur attended Modern School of New Delhi. He studied economics at St. Stephen's College. At 22, he became a Chartered Accountant with the ICAEW in England, having studied accountancy at the behest of his parents. He then started his career working with a multinational oil company. He moved to the United Kingdom in 1970, and spent several years working as an accountant and management consultant.

Filmmaking career

In India 

He turned director with the family drama Masoom (1983), starring Naseeruddin Shah, Shabana Azmi and a young Jugal Hansraj & Urmila Matondkar. The plot followed the story of an illegitimate boy who struggles to find acceptance from his stepmother. He then directed the 1987 science-fiction film Mr. India, starring Anil Kapoor, Sridevi and Amrish Puri in his most famous role as the villain Mogambo. Puri's most famous dialogue in this film "Mogambo Khush Hua" is still remembered. In 1994 he directed the critically acclaimed Bandit Queen and played a cameo in the film as a truck driver.

Kapur was infamous for abandoning several films he was originally the director of. He was originally the director of the 1989 film Joshilaay, which starred Sunny Deol, Anil Kapoor, Sridevi and Meenakshi Sheshadri before leaving the production halfway, and its producer Sibti Hassan Rizvi stepped in to complete the film. In 1992, he had shot some scenes for Barsaat, which was originally titled Champion and was going to be the debut film of Bobby Deol, but he left the production and was replaced by Rajkumar Santoshi. In 1995, he partly directed Dushmani, starring Sunny Deol, Jackie Shroff and Manisha Koirala before its producer Bunty Soorma stepped in to complete the film.

Kapur was the executive producer of the film The Guru. He established an Indian film company with Ram Gopal Verma and Mani Ratnam, though the group has thus far produced only one film, Dil Se.. (1998), starring Shahrukh Khan and Manisha Koirala. Kapur executive-produced the Bollywood-themed musical Bombay Dreams by Andrew Lloyd Webber, which ran in London's the West End and on Broadway in New York City for 1 year.

In 2016, Kapur delivers an autobiographical film and documentary about Amma, well known as Mata Amritanandamayi Devi, called "The Science of Compassion".

International 
In 1998, he received international recognition for the second time after Bandit Queen, when he directed the Academy Award-winning period film Elizabeth, a fictional account of the reign of British Queen Elizabeth I nominated for seven Oscars. The 2007 sequel, Elizabeth: The Golden Age, was nominated for two Oscars. He was accused of being anti-British by British tabloids for his portrayal of the British Army in the 2002 movie The Four Feathers. However, he denied the accusations and stated that he was merely "anti-colonisation".

Future projects 
It was announced in March 2019 that Kapur will be directing a TV series for Endemol Shine based on historical novels by Amitav Ghosh, known as the "Ibis Trilogy", which details the opium wars among Britain, India and China in the mid-19th century.

Kapur is all set to adapt Amish Tripathi's critically acclaimed book series Shiva Trilogy into a television web show. He will be co-directing the show with Suparn Verma.

Other ventures
Kapur started his career as an actor in the movie Jaan Hazir Hai (1975) and later in Toote Khilone, in Bollywood. He appeared in several Hindi television dramas, such as Udaan (Doordarshan), opposite Kavita Chaudhary, Upanyaas (Doordarshan) opposite Nisha Singh, and Masoom opposite Neena Gupta.

He served as judge on the reality TV series India's Got Talent, aired on Colors.

In an unusual role for him, Kapur provided the voice of Mohandas Gandhi in the Charkha Audiobooks title of The Story of My Experiments with Truth, alongside Nandita Das as narrator.

In 2013, Kapur hosted the TV show Pradhanmantri on ABP News. On the show, which aims to bring never-seen-before facets of Indian history, he was the narrator.

Comic book publishing

In 2006, Kapur formed Liquid Comics and Virgin Animation, an entertainment company focused on creating new stories and characters for a global audience. The Shakti titles of Kapur and Deepak Chopra's company debuted with Devi and The Sadhu. Devi is about "a fierce feminine warrior, stronger than the Gods themselves ... a champion of the heavens, and the protector of man", while The Sadhu "is about one man's choice between his spiritual oath and his human instinct."

Unrealized projects

Personal life 
Kapur had a seven year long relationship with actress Shabana Azmi. He was first married to Medha Gujral, niece of former Indian Prime Minister I. K. Gujral. They divorced in 1994. She died on 25 November 2014 at a hospital in New York City of liver failure following a second heart and first kidney transplant. Kapur later  married actress Suchitra Krishnamoorthi in 1999. They have a daughter named Kaveri Kapur. The couple divorced in 2007.

In March 2020, Suchitra filed a case against Kapur over a property dispute concerning their daughter, Kaveri. She claimed that the property rightfully belongs to their daughter, but has been rented to actor Kabir Bedi and his wife, Parveen.

Works

Awards and honours 
In 2000, he received Padma Shri, the fourth highest civilian award in India. In 2010, he served as one of the Jury Members in international competition at the 63rd Cannes Film Festival. In 2020, Kapur became the president of the Film and Television Institute of India.

Awards received by Shekhar Kapur's films

Directed Academy Award Performances

References

External links

 
 
 
 Arundhati Roy on Shekhar Kapur
 New York Times Biography
 Shekhar Kapur in Interview with 99FACES.tv

1945 births
Living people
BAFTA winners (people)
English-language film directors
Film directors from Lahore
Filmfare Awards winners
Golden Orange Honorary Award winners
Hindi-language film directors
Indian accountants
Indian bloggers
21st-century Indian film directors
Hindi film producers
Punjabi people
Recipients of the Padma Shri in arts
St. Stephen's College, Delhi alumni
Delhi University alumni
20th-century Indian film directors
Male actors from Lahore